She Shan Tsuen is a village in Lam Tsuen, Tai Po District, Hong Kong.

Administration
She Shan is a recognized village under the New Territories Small House Policy.

Conservation
The feng shui woodland at the back of the village of She Shan, covering an area of 5.7 hectares, was designated as a Site of Special Scientific Interest in 1975.

References

External links

 Delineation of area of existing village She Shan (Tai Po) for election of resident representative (2019 to 2022)
 Antiquities Advisory Board. Historic Building Appraisal. Chan Ancestral Hall, No. 28 She Shan Tsuen Pictures
 Antiquities and Monuments Office. Hong Kong Traditional Chinese Architectural Information System Chan Ancestral Hall (Lam Tsuen)

Villages in Tai Po District, Hong Kong
Lam Tsuen